Johannes Christoffel Breedt  (born 4 June 1959) is a South African former rugby union player.

Playing career

Breedt played for Northern Transvaal and Transvaal in the South African provincial competitions. He made his debut for Northern Transvaal in 1981 and in 1985 he relocated to Transvaal. He played 118 matches for Transvaal and captained the side on a 102 occasions, the first player to captain the province more than a hundred times. He led his team to four Currie Cup finals, finishing runner–up on each occasion.

Breedt made his test debut for the Springboks against the visiting New Zealand Cavaliers on 10 May 1986 at Newlands in Cape Town. In 1989, Breedt was appointed as Springbok captain for the two test matches against the World XV and so became the 41st Springbok test captain. He was capped 8 times for the Springboks.

Test history

Accolades
Breedt was one of the five nominees for 1985 SA Rugby player of the Year award. The other nominees for the award were Schalk Burger, Gerrie Sonnekus, Danie Gerber and the eventual winner of the award, Naas Botha.

See also
List of South Africa national rugby union players – Springbok no. 547
List of South Africa national rugby union team captains

References

1959 births
Living people
South African rugby union players
South Africa international rugby union players
People from Kempton Park, Gauteng
Golden Lions players
Rugby union players from Gauteng
Rugby union number eights
Rugby union flankers